= Barkheda Bondar =

- village
- Location within Madhya Pradesh Location within India
- Coordinates: 23.3010253°N 77.296542°E
- Country: India
- State: Madhya Pradesh
- District: Bhopal
- Tehsil: Huzur
- Elevation: 508 m (1,667 ft)

Population (2011)
  - Total: 2,005
- Time zone: UTC+5:30 (IST)
- ISO 3166 code: MP-IN
- 2011 census code: 482459

Barkheda Bondar is a village in the Bhopal district of Madhya Pradesh, India. It is located in the Huzur tehsil and the Phanda block.

== Demographics ==
According to the 2011 census of India, Barkheda Bondar has 435 households. The effective literacy rate (i.e. the literacy rate of population excluding children aged 6 and below) is 64.61%.

Demographics (2011 Census)
	Total	Male	Female
Population	2005	1019	986
Children aged below 6 years	270	138	132
Scheduled caste	376	182	194
Scheduled tribe	458	228	230
Literates	1121	650	471
Workers (all)	708	479	229
Main workers (total)	518	379	139
Main workers: Cultivators	76	59	17
Main workers: Agricultural labourers	343	256	87
Main workers: Household industry workers	14	6	8
Main workers: Other	85	58	27
Marginal workers (total)	190	100	90
Marginal workers: Cultivators	11	8	3
Marginal workers: Agricultural labourers	146	70	76
Marginal workers: Household industry workers	6	3	3
Marginal workers: Others	27	19	8
Non-workers	1297	540	757
